Industry is an unincorporated community in Clay and Dickinson counties in the U.S. state of Kansas.  It is located approximately 13 miles north of Abilene.

History
A post office was established at Lovejoy (an extinct town) in 1873, and moved to Industry in 1876 where it remained in operation until it was discontinued in 1906.

Education
The community is served by Chapman USD 473 public school district in Dickinson County, and Clay County USD 379 in Clay County.

References

Further reading

External links
 Clay County maps: Current, Historic, KDOT
 Dickinson County maps: Current, Historic, KDOT

Unincorporated communities in Clay County, Kansas
Unincorporated communities in Dickinson County, Kansas
Unincorporated communities in Kansas
1876 establishments in Kansas
Populated places established in 1876